James Isaac was an American film director.

James Isaac may also refer to:

Jimmy Isaac, English footballer

See also